Arnout Schuijff (born 1967/1968) is a Dutch billionaire Internet entrepreneur, and the co-founder and chief technology officer (CTO) of Adyen.

From 1997 to 2004, Schuijff was systems architect at Bibit Global Payment Services.

In 2006, Schuijff co-founded Adyen.

In June 2018, he became a billionaire after Adyen's IPO, based on his 6.4% stake in the company. Co-founder and CEO Pieter van der Does has a 4.8% stake worth $800 million, and his brother, Joost Schuijff, has a stake worth $500 million.

As of 2021, Arnout is ranked #859 on the Forbes list of billionaires and worth about US$3.5 billion.

Arnout is married, and lives in Amsterdam, Netherlands.

References

Living people
Dutch billionaires
Dutch company founders
1960s births